The 2000 Honda Indy 300 was the nineteenth and penultimate round of the 2000 CART World Series Season, held on 15 October 2000 on the Surfers Paradise Street Circuit, Surfers Paradise, Queensland, Australia, and was the 5th and last round to be held outside of the United States. It also marked 1998 Bathurst 1000 winner Jason Bright's first and only appearance in the series, where he finished 18th.

Qualifying results

Race

Caution flags

Notes

 Average Speed 81.607 mph

External links
 Full Weekend Times & Results

Honda Indy 300
Honda Indy 300
Gold Coast Indy 300